Lester del Rey (June 2, 1915 – May 10, 1993) was an American science fiction author and editor. He was the author of many books in the juvenile Winston Science Fiction series, and the editor at Del Rey Books, the fantasy and science fiction imprint of Ballantine Books, along with his fourth wife Judy-Lynn del Rey.

Birth name

Del Rey often told people his real name was Ramon Felipe Alvarez-del Rey (and sometimes even Ramon Felipe San Juan Mario Silvio Enrico Smith Heartcourt-Brace Sierra y Alvarez del Rey y de los Verdes). However, his sister has confirmed that his name was in fact  Leonard Knapp. He also claimed that his family was killed in a car accident in 1935. In reality, the accident only killed his first wife.

Career

Writing career
Del Rey first started publishing stories in pulp magazines in the late 1930s, at the dawn of the so-called Golden Age of Science Fiction. He was associated with the most prestigious science fiction magazine of the era, Astounding Science Fiction, from the time its editor John W. Campbell published his first short story in the April 1938 issue: "The Faithful", already under the name Lester del Rey. The December 1938 issue featured his story "Helen O'Loy" which was selected for the prestigious anthology The Science Fiction Hall of Fame. By the end of 1939 he had also placed stories in Weird Tales (edited by Farnsworth Wright) and Unknown (Campbell), which featured more horror and more fantasy respectively.

During a period when del Rey's work was not selling well, he worked as a short order cook at the White Tower Restaurant in New York.  After he married his second wife, Helen Schlaz, in 1945, he quit that job to write full-time.

In 1952, his first three novels were published in the Winston juvenile series, one of which (Rocket Jockey) appearing in an Italian-language edition in the same year.  In the 1950s, del Rey was one of the main authors writing science fiction for adolescents (along with Robert A. Heinlein and Andre Norton). During this time some of his fiction was published under multiple pseudonyms, including "Philip St. John" and "Erik van Lhin".

He continued publishing novels, as well as short fiction, both under his primary pseudonym Lester del Rey as well as a number of other pen names, at a fast pace through the 1950s and the early sixties. His novel writing slowed down toward the end of the sixties, with his last novel, Weeping May Tarry (written with Raymond F. Jones) appearing from Pinnacle Books in 1978.

Editor and critic

After meeting Scott Meredith at the 1947 World Science Fiction Convention, he began working as a first reader for the new Scott Meredith Literary Agency, where he also served as office manager.

He later became an editor for several pulp magazines and then for book publishers. During 1952 and 1953, del Rey edited several magazines: Space SF, Fantasy Fiction, Science Fiction Adventures (as Philip St. John), Rocket Stories (as Wade Kaempfert), and Fantasy Fiction (as Cameron Hall). During this period he also edited several anthologies, notably editing the "Best Science Fiction Stories of the Year" series from 1972 to 1976.

Del Rey was most successful editing with his fourth wife, Judy-Lynn del Rey, at Ballantine Books (as a Random House property, post-Ballantine) where they established the fantasy and science fiction imprint Del Rey Books in 1977. He retired from the publishing house in February 1992.

In 1957, del Rey and Damon Knight co-edited a small amateur magazine named Science Fiction Forum.  During a debate about symbolism within the magazine, del Rey accepted Knight's challenge to write an analysis of the James Blish story "Common Time" that showed the story was about a man eating a ham sandwich.  After science fiction gained respectability and began to be taught in classrooms, del Rey stated that academics interested in the genre should "get out of my ghetto." Del Rey stated that "to develop science fiction had to remove itself from the usual critics who viewed it from the perspective of [the] mainstream, and who judged its worth largely on its mainstream values. As part of that mainstream, it would never have had the freedom to make the choices it did – many of them quite possibly wrong, but necessary for its development."

Starting in September 1969, he wrote the "Reading Room" review column for If, and following the demise of If in 1974, switched to writing the review column for Analog Science Fiction and Fact entitled "The Reference Library".

Del Rey was a member of a literary banqueting club, the Trap Door Spiders, which served as the basis of Isaac Asimov's fictional group of mystery solvers, the Black Widowers. Del Rey was the model for "Emmanuel Rubin".

Style
"There is no writer in this field who is more steadfast in practicing the rule that fiction is first of all entertainment", Algis Budrys said in 1965. Reporting that the stories in a collection of del Rey's fiction could not be dated by reading them, Budrys stated that he had remained a successful writer because "del Rey has remained his own individual ... he writes for himself, and his readers". Budrys said that

Awards
Del Rey was awarded the 1972 E. E. Smith Memorial Award for Imaginative Fiction (the "Skylark") by the New England Science Fiction Association for "contributing significantly to science fiction, both through work in the field and by exemplifying the personal qualities that made the late "Doc" Smith well-loved by those who knew him". He also won a special 1985 Balrog Award for his contributions to fantasy, voted by fans and organized by Locus Magazine. The Science Fiction Writers of America named him its 11th SFWA Grand Master in 1990, presented 1991.

Death
Lester del Rey died on May 10, 1993, at New York Hospital at the age of 77 after a brief illness.

Selected works

Novels
 Marooned on Mars (1952)
 Rocket Jockey as Philip St. John (1952)
 A Pirate Flag for Monterey (1952)
 Attack from Atlantis (1953)
 Battle on Mercury as Erik Van Lhin (1953)
 The Mysterious Planet as Kenneth Wright (1953)
 Rockets to Nowhere as Philip St. John (1954)
 Step to the Stars (1954)
 For I Am a Jealous People (1954)
 Preferred Risk (1955) with Frederik Pohl [as by Edson McCann]
 Mission to the Moon (1956)
 Nerves (1956)
 Police Your Planet as Erik Van Lhin (1956)
 Day of the Giants (1959)
 Moon of Mutiny (1961)
 The Eleventh Commandment (1962)
 Outpost of Jupiter (1963)
 The Sky Is Falling (1963)
 Badge of Infamy (1963)
 The Runaway Robot (1965) 
 The Infinite Worlds of Maybe (1966)
 Rocket from Infinity (1966)
 The Scheme of Things (1966)
 Siege Perilous (1966)
 Tunnel Through Time (1966)
 Prisoners of Space (1968)
 Psi (1971)
 Pstalemate (1971)
 Weeping May Tarry (1978) with Raymond F. Jones

Short fiction collections
 ... And Some Were Human (1948)
 Robots and Changelings (1957)
 The Sky Is Falling and Badge of Infamy (1966)
 Mortals and Monsters (1965)
 Gods and Golems (1973)
 The Early del Rey (1975)
 The Early del Rey: Vol 1 (1976)
 The Early del Rey: Vol 2 (1976)
 The Best of Lester del Rey (1978)
 War and Space (2009)
 Robots and Magic (2010)

Nonfiction
 Rockets Through Space (1957)
 Space Flight, General Mills, Inc. 1958, 1957; Golden Press, 1959
 The Mysterious Earth (1960)
 The Mysterious Sea (1961)
 The Mysterious Sky (1964)
 The World of Science Fiction, 1926-1976: the History of a Subculture (1980)

As editor
 The Year After Tomorrow with Carl Carmer & Cecile Matschat (1954)
 Best Science Fiction of the Year #1–5 (1972–1976)

References

Citations

General and cited references

External links 

 
 
 
 
 

1915 births
1993 deaths
20th-century American male writers
20th-century American novelists
20th-century pseudonymous writers
American book editors
American literary critics
American male non-fiction writers
American male novelists
American science fiction writers
American speculative fiction critics
American speculative fiction editors
George Washington University alumni
Pulp fiction writers
Science fiction critics
Science fiction editors
SFWA Grand Masters